Hasan Egilmez (born 11 September 1977) is a German/Turkish football manager formerly in charge of a scouting company which worked for Bayern Munich, Arsenal FC, Newcastle and several other scouting projects.

Biography
Egilmez was born in Sindelfingen. Before his career as coach/scout he played as a striker for VfL Sindelfingen. Egilmez is former Technical Director of the Euro Football Academy in Nigeria and produced more than 30 professional players for European teams. He was the Chief Scout for Africa in the Euro Football Academy.

Egilmez was Head Coach & Manager of Nigerian Professional National League Side 36 Lion FC. He was also Head Coach & Manager of Albanian Superleague Side FK Tomori Berat. He is currently Managing Famous Football Stars.

References

External links
http://www.sabah.com.tr/Spor/Galatasaray/2013/07/01/mikel-obi-aslan-gibi
 http://www.sabah.com.tr/Spor/Galatasaray/2013/06/09/obi-mikel-gsaraya-cok-yakin
 https://archive.today/20130813095846/http://www.ajansspor.com/futbol/superlig/h/20130608/son_bomba_obi_mikel.html
 http://skorer.milliyet.com.tr/galatasaray-obi-mikel-icin/galatasaray/detay/1719830/default.htm
 http://www.fotospor.com/haber_galatasarayin-john-obi-mikel-isi-ciddiye-bindi_128968
 https://web.archive.org/web/20130812075639/http://www.mtnfootball.com/europe/epl/news/2013/june/07-galatasaray-open-talks-with-chelsea-for-mikel.html
 http://www.ttspor.com/tag/fk-tomori-berat/
 http://yenisafak.com.tr/spor-haber/turk-teknik-adam-nijeryaya-gitti-18.04.2013-511996
https://archive.today/20130130234207/http://www.panorama-sport.com/kategoria-superiore/prezantohet-egilmez-ja-si-e-ndryshoj-tomorin/
http://www.supersport.com/football/article.aspx?Id=1558531
http://www.goal.com/en-ng/news/4093/nigeria/2012/10/18/3456719/national-league-side-36-lions-signs-players-pact-with
http://www.supersport.com/football/article.aspx?Id=1160691
http://www.9jafootball.com/compeletenews1.php?newssplash=Foreigner+For+Kano+Pillar
https://archive.today/20130222171713/http://www.tribune.com.ng/sat/index.php/sports/6089-bosso-battles-foreigners-for-enyimbas-job.html

German football managers
Living people
1977 births